Live at Wembley is a live album by the rock band Bad Company released in 2011. It was recorded on April 11, 2010 from a concert at the Wembley Arena in London, England.

Track listing

DVD / Blu-ray / UK 2CD Editions 
Can't Get Enough (Mick Ralphs) - 5:02
Honey Child (Boz Burrell, Simon Kirke, Ralphs, Paul Rodgers) - 4:03
Run with the Pack (Rodgers) - 4:22
Burnin' Sky (Rodgers) - 6:28
Young Blood (Doc Pomus) - 4:31
Seagull (Ralphs, Rodgers) - 4:46
Gone, Gone, Gone (Burrell) - 4:28
Electricland (Rodgers) - 5:34
Simple Man (Ralphs) - 5:31
Feel Like Makin' Love (Ralphs, Rodgers) - 6:46
Shooting Star (Rodgers) - 7:24
Rock 'n' Roll Fantasy (Rodgers) - 4:36
Movin' On (Ralphs) - 4:40
Ready for Love (Ralphs) - 8:07
Bad Company (Kirke, Rodgers) - 7:25
Deal with the Preacher (Ralphs, Rodgers) - 5:40

The US CD release excludes Burnin' Sky (track 4) and edited versions of other songs to fit on a single disc.

Personnel
Paul Rodgers – lead vocals, piano, guitar
Mick Ralphs – lead guitar, background vocals
Howard Leese – guitar, background vocals, piano
Lynn Sorensen - bass, background vocals
Simon Kirke – drums

Credits
Producer: Chris Crawford, Geoff Kempin and Paul M. Green
Distributor: Eagle Records
Recording type: Live
Recording mode: Stereo
Recorded in London, England on 11 April 2010
Release Date: UK 18 July 2010, US 28 June 2011

References

Bad Company albums
2011 live albums